Gymnadenia austriaca is a species of plant in the family Orchidaceae. It was first described by Teppner and Klein as a subspecies of Nigratella nigra (ssp austriaca) and was subsequently reclassified as G. austriaca as an apomictic member of the G. nigra group within the genus Gymnadenia.

References

austriaca